Lotte Strauss (15 April 1913 – 4 July 1985) was a German-American pathologist.

She was born in Nuremberg, Germany. Strauss, alongside Jacob Churg, attributed her name to Churg–Strauss syndrome, which is now known as eosinophilic granulomatosis with polyangiitis. She was one of the founders of the Society for Pediatric Pathology. Strauss was also part of a group that made significant contributions to the understanding of renal pathology. The group included Lotte Strauss, Jacob Churg and Edith Grishman, and was deemed “most productive for many years”. Strauss became the first pediatric pathologist at Mount Sinai Hospital in Manhattan, New York, and made valuable contributions to the area of fetal development pathology. Lotte Strauss worked with Donald Gribetz at Mount Sinai Hospital in the pediatric pathology department. Later on, she became an associate pathologist in the Division of Pediatric Pathology, as well as a professor of pathology at The Mount Sinai School of Medicine.

The Society for Pediatric Pathology annually awards The Lotte Strauss Prize to an individual under 40 years of age for their contribution to pediatric pathology that has been "published or accepted for publication during the year immediately preceding the award".

Works 
 Churg, Jacob., Strauss, Lotte., “Allergic Granulomatosis, Allergic Angiitis, and Periartritis Nodosa” The American Journal of Pathology. Vol. 27, no.2,1951.pp. 277–301
 Kirschner, Paul., Strauss, Lotte. “Pulmonary Interstitial Emphysema in the Newborn Infant Precursors and Sequelae: A Clinical and Pathologic Study.” Disease of The Chest. vol. 46, no. 4, 1964, pp. 417–426. Science Direct, doi: 10.1378/chest.46.4.417
 Leonidas, John., Strauss, Lotte., Krasna, Irwin. “Roentgen Diagnosis of Multicystic Renal Dysplasia in Infancy by High Dose Urography.” The Journal of Urology. vol. 108, no. 6, 1972, pp. 963–965. Science Direct, doi: 10.1016/s0022-5347(17)60920-0
 Quan, Angel., Strauss, Lotte. “Congenital Cytomegalic Inclusion Disease; Observations in a Macerated Fetus With Congenital Defect, Including a Study of the Placenta.” American Journal of Obstetrics and Gynecology, vol. 83, no. 9, 1962, pp. 1240–1248. Science Direct, doi: 10.1016/0002-9378(62)90222-3 
 Rausen, Aaron., Seki, Masako., Strauss, Lotte. “Twin Transfusion Syndrome: A Review of 19 Cases Studied at One Institution.” The Journal of Paediatrics. vol. 66, no. 3, 1965, pp. 613–628. Science Direct, doi: 10.1016/S0022-3476(65)80125-1
 Rosenfeld, Isadore., Silverblatt, Marvin., Strauss, Lotte. “Total Anomalous Pulmonary Venous Drainage Into the Portal Vein.” American Heart Journal. vol. 53, no. 4, 1957, pp. 616–623. Science Direct, doi: 10.1016/0002-8703(57)90368-X
 Sotolongo, Jose., Rose, Judith., Strauss, Lotte., Gribetz, Micheal. “Single Vaginal Ectopic Ureter and the Vater Syndrome.” The Journal of Urology. vol. 127, no. 6, 1982, pp. 1181–1182. Science Direct, doi:10.1016/S0022-5347(17)54286-X
 Strauss, Lotte., Churg, Jacob., Zak, Frederick. “Cutaneous Lesions of Allergive Granulomatosis : A Histopathologic Study.” Journal of Investigative Dermatology. vol. 17, no. 6, 1951, pp. 349–359. Science Direct, doi: 10.1038/jid.1951.1951.103

Achievements 
In 1983, Strauss was awarded the Jacobi Medallion by the Mount Sinai Alumni. It is based on an individual's "distinguished achievement in the field of medicine or extraordinary service to the Hospital, the School, or the Alumni Association."

Literature 
 Eberhard J. Wormer: Angiologie - Phlebologie. Syndrome und ihre Schöpfer. München 1991, S. 23-25
 American Men and Women in Science 6 (1986) 1088
 Obituary: Lotte Strauss, M.D. International Pathol 26 (1985) no. 3

References

American pathologists
Icahn School of Medicine at Mount Sinai faculty
1913 births
1985 deaths
German women scientists
Women pathologists
20th-century American physicians
20th-century American women scientists
Physicians from Nuremberg
American women academics
German emigrants to the United States